Max Ward, occasionally playing under the moniker of Hirax Max, is an American power violence and thrashcore musician, playing for such bands as Spazz, Plutocracy, Capitalist Casualties, What Happens Next?, Bombs of Death, and Scholastic Deth. He is also known for his extreme support of the D.I.Y. scene, having released records and booked tours for hundreds of local, national, and international bands, while still living in the San Francisco Bay Area.  He is the founder of 625 Thrashcore records

625 Thrashcore

625 Thrashcore is an American record label started by Ward in 1993. They put out records of different genres, including hardcore, grindcore, thrashcore, powerviolence and others, mainly from the US and Japan.

Artists include:
Charles Bronson
Exhumed
Iron Lung
NoComply
R.A.M.B.O.
Spazz
What Happens Next?

External links
 compiled interviews, including from Maximum Rock N' Roll
 Max Ward at Metal-archives
 
 A Fan-made discography

American music industry executives
Year of birth missing (living people)
Living people
American record labels
Grindcore record labels
Thrash metal record labels
Powerviolence